Aneflus calvatus is a species of beetle in the family Cerambycidae. It was described by Horn in 1885.

References

Aneflus
Beetles described in 1885